Lori McNeil and Helena Suková were the defending champions but did not compete that year.

Lindsay Davenport and Mary Joe Fernández won in the final 6–1, 6–3 against Irina Spîrlea and Nathalie Tauziat.

Seeds
Champion seeds are indicated in bold text while text in italics indicates the round in which those seeds were eliminated.

 Lindsay Davenport /  Mary Joe Fernández (champions)
 Chanda Rubin /  Brenda Schultz-McCarthy (first round)
 Yayuk Basuki /  Caroline Vis (semifinals)
 Elizabeth Smylie /  Linda Wild (first round)

Draw

External links
 1996 Bank of the West Classic Doubles Draw

Silicon Valley Classic
1996 WTA Tour